Yonkers is a city in the state of New York.

Yonkers may also refer to:

 Yonkers station, a railroad station that serves the downtown area of Yonkers, New York
 Yonkers F.C., an early twentieth century amateur U.S. soccer team
 Yonkers, Georgia, an unincorporated community
 "Yonkers" (song), by Tyler, The Creator from Goblin

See also
 Yonkers High School
 Michael Yonkers, an American rock musician
 Terry A. Yonkers, United States Assistant Secretary of the Air Force